Fragmentary Evidence is the second full-length album by the Canadian progressive death metal band Augury. It was released in Europe on July 17, 2009 and in North America on August 11, 2009.

Track listing
All lyrics written by Patrick Loisel.

Personnel
Augury
 Patrick Loisel – vocals, electric guitar, 12-string acoustic guitar
 Mathieu Marcotte – electric guitar, 12-string acoustic guitar
 Dominic (Forest) Lapointe – 4-string fretless bass, 6-string bass
 Étienne Gallo – drums

Guest Vocalists
 Sven De Caluwe (Aborted) - "Aetheral"
 Eric Fiset - "Aetheral"
 Sébastien Croteau - "Orphans of Living"
 Syriak - "Sovereigns Unknown" and "Brimstone Landscapes"
 Leilindel (UneXpect) - "Sovereigns Unknown" and "Brimstone Landscapes"
 Youri Raymond - "Faith Puppeteers" and "Oversee the Rebirth"
 Filip Ivanovic - "Oversee the Rebirth"

Production
 Hugues Deslauriers - Producer, Assistant mixing, recording for vocals, bass, 12-string acoustic guitar, guitar solos and clean electric guitars
 Yannick St-Amand - producer, recording for drums and rhythm guitar
 J-F Dagenais - mixing
 Antoine Lussier - assistant engineer on drum editing
 James Murphy - mastering

Additional
 Sven - cover artwork and layout
 Martin Lacroix - logo design
 Mélany Champagne - photography
 Ethan Djankovich - sound effects

References

2009 albums
Augury (band) albums